The mayoral election of 1997 in Pittsburgh, Pennsylvania was held on Tuesday, November 4, 1997. The incumbent mayor, Tom Murphy of the Democratic Party was running for a second straight term.

Democratic Primary
Murphy faced a difficult battle from City Council President Bob O'Connor, who would later go on to become mayor. The incumbent's popularity was waning due to his steadfast of two controversial measures: a tax to construct new stadiums for the Pittsburgh Steelers and Pittsburgh Pirates, and a faltering public-private partnership to purchase vacant Downtown storefronts. The battle was especially tense due to personality differences between the two men that led to frequently clashes over legislation.

General Election
A total of 82,203 votes were cast in the general election. As is typical of races in Pittsburgh, the Democratic candidate won by a large margin over Republican Harry Frost, a construction executive.

References

 

1997 Pennsylvania elections
1997 United States mayoral elections
1997
1990s in Pittsburgh
November 1997 events in the United States